Séguédin may refer to: 
Séguédin, Nanoro
Séguédin, Siglé
Séguédin, Soaw

See also
Segedin (disambiguation)